The Romaine-3 Generating Station is a 395 MW hydroelectric generating station on the Romaine River in the Côte-Nord region of the province of Quebec, Canada. It is owned and operated by Hydro-Québec.

Description

The dams and generating station are part of a huge hydroelectric complex with four dams that was launched in 2009 under the government of Jean Charest.
The main dam is the second highest in the Romaine complex after Romaine-2.

There are two dams, both completed in 2017.
It is a rockfill dam with zoned core, built on treated rock.
The smaller B3 dyke is west of the main dam and contains the spillway.
It is a concrete gravity dam built on treated rock.

The main dam is between PK158 and PK159 on the river.
The spillway discharges into the Romaine River at PK158.
A gallery leads from a point southeast of the main dam to the generating station south of the dam at PK155 on the river.
The generating station has installed capacity of 395 MW.
Average annual energy production is 2 TWh, with a capacity factor of 0.58.

History

The overall Romaine project was formally launched by Jean Charest in May 2009.
A  road was built to provide access to the four dams.
The Mista camp was built at PK 118 on this road to accommodate the workers assigned to the Romaine 3 and Romaine 4 facilities.
It could accommodate up to 1,744 people.

In July 2013 Alstom was awarded a contract to supply, install and commission two 200MW vertical Francis turbine-generator units, with butterfly valves and regulation systems, at Romaine-3.
In September 2013 Hydro-Quebec called for bids to construct the dam and embankment B3, excavate the spillway and intake channel, and undertake other related work.
A crushing works was built in 2014–2015 to make gravel for use in the Romaine 3 concrete.
In March 2015 a shovel operator died in the Romaine-3 site after the ice of a drainage channel broke under his vehicle.

The Romaine-3 Generating Station came into service in 2017.
It was inaugurated by Quebec premier Philippe Couillard and Hydro-Québec President Eric Martel in a ceremony on 19 October 2017.
The plant was to be connected to the Quebec electrical grid in phases.
In September 2017 Hydro-Québec had said it had no plans for more dams due to the present surplus of electricity.
Couillard confirmed that no more major projects were planned.

Controversies

The company had to negotiate several agreements with the local Innu communities, paying more than CDN$200 million over a 60-year period to compensate for the effects of the dams, roads and electric transmission lines.

There were a number of controversies.
In March 2012 Quebec Route 138 was blocked at Maliotenam by the Innu, who were demanding compensation for the power lines on their territory.
In June 2015 Route 138 was blocked at Pessamit and Maliotenam, and the access road to the construction site was blocked, by construction workers demanding that more local workers be hired.
In July 2015 the road to the site was blocked by the Innu of Natashquan who felt that Hydro-Quebec did not respect the agreement signed in 2008.
In March 2016 a court rejected the demand by Innu families of Uashat mak Mani-utenam to stop the project.
In November 2016 there was controversy over the waste of wood cut in the reservoirs.

Notes

Sources

 

Dams in Quebec
Minganie Regional County Municipality
Dams completed in 2017
Energy infrastructure completed in 2017